Markus Sipilä (born 14 January 1980) is a Finnish curler.

At the national level, he is a four-time Finnish mixed champion curler (2018, 2019, 2020, 2022) and one-time Finnish mixed doubles champion curler (2022).

Teams

Men's

Mixed

Mixed doubles

Personal life
Markus is married to fellow curler Nina Sipilä and has two children.

He started curling in 1997 at the age of 17.

References

External links

Living people
1980 births
Finnish male curlers
Finnish curling champions
Date of birth missing (living people)
21st-century Finnish people